Corey Stoll (born March 14, 1976) is an American actor. He is best known for his roles as Congressman Peter Russo on the Netflix political thriller series House of Cards (2013–2016), for which he received a Golden Globe nomination in 2013, and Dr. Ephraim Goodweather on the FX horror drama series The Strain (2014–2017). Since 2020, he has portrayed Michael Prince, a business rival to protagonist  Bobby Axelrod, in the Showtime series Billions. He was also a regular cast member on the NBC drama series Law & Order: LA (2010–2011).  

Stoll portrayed Darren Cross / Yellowjacket / M.O.D.O.K. in the Marvel Cinematic Universe films Ant-Man (2015) and its sequel Ant-Man and the Wasp: Quantumania (2023).  Other notable roles include an off-Broadway performance of Intimate Apparel (2004), Ernest Hemingway in the romantic comedy film Midnight in Paris (2011) a performance for which he was nominated for the Independent Spirit Award for Best Supporting Male, bulldog prosecutor Fred Wyshak in Black Mass (2015), astronaut Buzz Aldrin in the biopic First Man (2018), and Junior Soprano in The Many Saints of Newark.

Early life
Corey Stoll was born on the Upper West Side of New York City's Manhattan borough, the son of Judith and Stephen Stoll. His father co-founded The Beacon School. Stoll was raised Jewish. He studied drama at Long Lake Camp for the Arts from 1988 to 1992, and is a drama graduate of Fiorello H. LaGuardia High School of Music & Art and Performing Arts. He graduated from Oberlin College in 1998 and enrolled in the Graduate Acting Program at New York University's Tisch School of the Arts, graduating in 2003.

Career

In 2004, Stoll received a Drama Desk Award nomination as Outstanding Featured Actor in a Play for Intimate Apparel, opposite Tony winner and Oscar winner Viola Davis. He went on to appear in several films, including North Country, Lucky Number Slevin, the television film A Girl Like Me: The Gwen Araujo Story, Brief Interviews with Hideous Men, and Push. In 2010, he appeared in Helena from the Wedding and Salt.

Stoll starred as LAPD Detective Tomas Jaruszalski on the NBC police drama Law & Order: LA. He played Ernest Hemingway in Woody Allen's 2011 film Midnight in Paris. Stoll, who is mostly bald, wore a custom wig for the role. In 2013, Stoll received a Golden Globe Award nomination for his performance in the Netflix series House of Cards. After House of Cards, he joined the FX horror television series The Strain, which is based on a series of novels written by Chuck Hogan and film director Guillermo del Toro.

In 2014, Stoll also played Austin Reilly, an NYPD police officer, in the action film Non-Stop, and Paul Altman in the comedy-drama This Is Where I Leave You. In 2015, Stoll played Ben Day in the film Dark Places, based on the novel by Gillian Flynn, and had a major role as the villain in the superhero film Ant-Man, playing Darren Cross, later reimagined as the supervillain Yellowjacket. The following year, he reunited with Woody Allen, playing gangster Ben Dorfman in his 2016 film Café Society. Also in the summer of 2016, he played the wily Greek warrior Ulysses in the Public Theater production of Troilus and Cressida by William Shakespeare, in Central Park.

In January 2019, it was announced that Stoll would recur in the Netflix drama series Ratched. Since 2020, he has portrayed Michael Prince, a business rival to Bobby Axelrod, in the Showtime series Billions.

Personal life
Stoll became engaged to his girlfriend Nadia Bowers, an actress, in October 2014. They were married on June 21, 2015. They had their first child in October 2015.

Filmography

Film

Television

Stage

References

External links

 
 

1976 births
Living people
21st-century American male actors
American male film actors
American male stage actors
American male television actors
Jewish American male actors
Male actors from New York City
Oberlin College alumni
Tisch School of the Arts alumni